A guksae or oksae (국새,옥새) is an official seal made for used in lieu of signatures in personal documents, office paperwork, contracts, art, or any item requiring acknowledgment or authorship in South Korea. Guksae is carved with characters called injang. With the establishment of the South Korean state in 1948, its government created a new state seal, or guksae (국새, 國璽). It is used in promulgation of constitution, designation of cabinet members and ambassadors, conference of national orders and important diplomatic documents.

See also
Imperial Seal of China
Cash seal (China)
Seal script
Seal cutting (art)
Seal engraving (art)
Seal knob

References 

 

Seals (insignia)
Authentication methods
Identity documents
Politics of South Korea